is the fifth major single (eighth overall) released by Japanese pop rock band Scandal. The title track was used as the fourth ending theme of the Fullmetal Alchemist: Brotherhood anime series. The single was released in two versions: a limited edition that was housed in a Fullmetal Alchemist: Brotherhood cardboard jacket and came with a bonus track, and a regular edition with a first press consisting of an alternate cover, a special Scandal booklet, and a Brotherhood sticker. The second B-side, "Yumemiru Koro wo Sugitemo", is a cover of Hillbilly Bops' song of the same name, which was the answered song of their previous single, "Yumemiru Tsubasa". The single reached #7 on the Oricon weekly chart and charted for thirteen weeks, selling 32,624 copies. It was certified platinum by the RIAJ for selling over 250,000 digital copies in January 2016.

Track listing

References 

2010 singles
Scandal (Japanese band) songs
Fullmetal Alchemist songs
2010 songs
Epic Records singles